Pennisetia bohemica is a moth of the family Sesiidae. It is found in the Czech Republic, Slovenia, Croatia and Greece.

The wingspan is 25–32 mm. Adults are on wing from the end of July to September.

The larvae feed on Rosa canina and Rosa arvensis. They feed on the roots of their host plant for two years. Pupation takes place in a gallery without making a cocoon.

References

Moths described in 1974
Sesiidae
Moths of Europe